The Battle of El-Moungar was a battle fought during the South-Oranese Campaign between a contingent of the French Army of Africa, mainly from the French Foreign Legion, and Moroccan tribesmen.

Background
In the early twentieth century, French troops in Algeria faced numerous incidents, attacks and looting by uncontrolled armed groups in the newly controlled areas to the south of Oran. Under the command of General Lyautey, the French army's mission was to protect these areas newly occupied in the west of Algeria, near the poorly defined Moroccan boundaries. This loose boundary, between French Algeria and the Sultanate of Morocco, promoted incursions and attacks by Moroccan tribesmen.

On 17 August 1903, the first battle of the South-Oranese campaign took place in Taghit when a contingent of the French Foreign Legion was attacked by more than 1,000 well-equipped Berbers. For three days, the legionnaires repelled repeated attacks of an enemy more than 10 times their number, and inflicted heavy losses on the attackers, forcing them finally into retreat.

The battle 
A few days after the Battle of Taghit, 148 legionnaires of the 22nd mounted company, from the 2e REI, commanded by Captain Vauchez and Lieutenant Selchauhansen, 20 Spahis and two Mokhaznis were escorting a supply convoy, when they were ambushed at 9:30 am on 2 September by 3,000 Moroccan tribesmen. The half-company had halted to eat, no sentries had been posted, and only a few cavalry pickets had been placed.

The first volleys wounded or killed half of the detachment. Both officers and most of the non-commissioned officers were killed in the first stage of the fight. At 10:30 am, Quartermaster Sergeant (sergent-fourrier) Tisserand, who commanded the survivors, sent two spahi cavalrymen to Taghit for reinforcements. They immediately left.

About forty survivors of the French force gathered on a nearby hill and under a scorching sun, on hot sand and without water, fought off the enemy for more than eight hours. Near the end of the battle, Tisserand, wounded, gave over command to Corporal Detz; the highest ranked man still able. At 5 pm, they were relieved by Captain de Sulbielle, who rode from Taghit with his Spahis. At the sight of the approaching French cavalry, the Moroccans retreated in small groups.

Aftermath
Total French losses were 38 dead and 46 wounded. A presidential decree granted to all survivors of the battle the Colonial Medal, and Tisserand was promoted to lieutenant. In spite of the courage shown by the legionnaires, the heavy losses suffered by the half-company and indications that inadequate precautions had led to the initial success of the ambush caused serious concern. The commander of the Ain Sefra military region was replaced and Brigadier General Hubert Lyautey appointed in his place.

References

Bibliography
Jean-Paul Mahuault, L'épopée marocaine de la Légion étrangère, 1903-1934, ou, Trente années au Maroc, L'Harmattan, 2005.

Battles involving France
Battles involving the French Foreign Legion
Conflicts in 1903
September 1903 events